Seal Sands is a 294.37 hectare biological Site of Special Scientific Interest in County Durham, England, notified in 1966.

Situated in the mouth of the River Tees next to Greatham Creek and Seaton-on-Tees Channel, the site is accessible from the A178 road running between Seaton Carew and Port Clarence.

SSSIs are designated by Natural England, formerly English Nature, which uses the 1974–1996 county system. This means there is no grouping of SSSIs by Stockton-on-Tees unitary authority, or County Durham which is the relevant ceremonial county. As such Seal Sands is one of 18 SSSIs in the Cleveland area of search.

An area of reclaimed land is given over to chemical industries.

Chemical industries site
On land recovered from the sea, an area of Seal Sands is used as an industrial park for the chemical industry. Members of the Northeast of England Process Industry Cluster (NEPIC) using the site include: Ineos, Fine Organics, Central Area Transmission System (BP Group), SABIC, Vertellus, ConocoPhillips, Vopak, Simon Storage, Intertek Caleb Brett, Harvest Operations. Both Greenergy and Air Products abandoned their plans to each operate a plasma gasification waste-to-energy facility at Seal Sands.

See also 
Nearby
 Seaton Dunes and Common SSSI
 Tees and Hartlepool Foreshore and Wetlands SSSI
 River Tees
 Hartlepool nuclear power station
 Able UK
 Northeast of England Process Industry Cluster
 Seal Sands Power Station

References

Sources 
 English Nature citation sheet for the site  (accessed 5 August 2006).

External links 
 English Nature (SSSI information)
 Site boundary map at English Nature's "Nature on the Map" website.

River Tees
Sites of Special Scientific Interest in Cleveland, England
Sites of Special Scientific Interest notified in 1966